Chake Chake District  is one of two administrative districts of Pemba South Region in Tanzania. The district is comparable in size to the land area of American Samoa. The district has a water border to the east and west by the Indian Ocean. The district is bordered to the south by Mkoani District and the north by Wete District of Pemba North Region. The district seat (capital) is the town of Chake-Chake. According to the 2012 census, the district has a total population of 97,249.

Administrative subdivisions
As of 2012, Chake Chake District was administratively divided into 31 wards.

Wards

 Chachani
 Chanjaani
 Chonga
 Dodo
 Kibokoni
 Kichungwani
 Kilindi
 Kwale
 Madungu
 Matale

 Mbuzini
 Mfikiwa
 Mgelema
 Mgogoni
 Michungwani
 Mkoroshoni
 Msingini
 Mvumoni
 Ndagoni
 Ng'ambwa

 Pujini
 Shungi
 Tibirinzi
 Uwandani
 Vitongoji
 Wara
 Wawi
 Wesha
 Ziwani

References

Pemba South Region